Destroy 2000 Years of Culture is a song by Atari Teenage Riot, released as the fourth and final single from their 1997 album The Future of War. The single was released as a 12" vinyl record and as a limited edition CD, with only 500 copies made. The CD edition contains an unlisted hidden track: An instrumental version of the B-side "Paranoid".

Overview
The track revolves around a sample of the track "Dead Skin Mask" by Slayer, from their 1990 album Seasons in the Abyss. It also contains rapping by Alec Empire.

A music video was produced for the track, which shows Alec Empire rapping against grainy, highly saturated footage with a metal device in his neck. Also shown are brief clips of fellow band members Carl Crack and Hanin Elias standing in front of an what appears to be an apocalyptic setting.

Track listing

Personnel
Alec Empire – production, writing
Hanin Elias – writing
Steve Rooke – mastering
Henni Hell – cover artwork

References

External links
 discogs.com CD entry
 discogs.com 12" vinyl entry

Atari Teenage Riot songs
1997 singles
1997 songs